Erich Brost (29 October 1903 – 8 October 1995) was a German journalist and publisher.

Biography 
Brost was born in Elbing, West Prussia to a Schichau-Werke shipyard worker and a tailor. In 1915 his family moved to Danzig (modern Gdańsk, Poland), where he became a bookseller and engaged in politics and the labour movement.
 
Aged 19 Brost wrote his first column for the Social democratic Danziger Volksstimme, for which he worked until 1936, when the Volksstimme got suspended and the Social Democratic Party of the Free City of Danzig was forbidden. In 1935 he became a member of the Volkstag, the Free City of Danzig's parliament, representing the SPD. Brost went into exile to Poland, Sweden, Finland and Great Britain, where he worked for the BBC. After World War II and the expulsion of the German populace Brost moved to the Ruhr area in 1945 to build up the German News Service, a predecessor of the Deutsche Presse-Agentur (dpa). Brost was active in the Social Democratic Party of Germany and represented the party at the Allied Control Council. He received an Allied licence to publish a newspaper in the British Zone of occupied Germany. The first copy of the Westdeutsche Allgemeine Zeitung (WAZ) was published on 3 April 1948 and Brost influenced the WAZ for the next decades.

Brost founded the Erich-Brost-Stiftung in 1991, the "Erich Brost University Lecturership" at the University of Oxford's "Institute of European and Comparative Law" is dedicated to him.

Erich-Brost-Danzig-Award 

Brost donated the Erich-Brost-Danzig-Preis of 20,000 Euro, which is awarded to people or institutions for their merits in Polish-German reconciliation.

It was awarded to:

 1996: Kashubian-Pomeranian Association
 1997: Stefan Chwin, author
 1998: Szczepan Baum and Ryszard Semka, Architects
 1999: "Forschungsstelle Osteuropa" at the University of Bremen
 2001: Cultural Association "Borussia", Olsztyn
 2003: the twin towns of Bremen and Gdańsk

References

External links 
 Erich Brost Institute for international journalism

1903 births
1995 deaths
People from West Prussia
People from Elbląg
Social Democratic Party of Germany politicians
Free City of Danzig politicians
German male journalists
German journalists
German newspaper journalists
20th-century German journalists
German male writers
Grand Crosses with Star and Sash of the Order of Merit of the Federal Republic of Germany
Westdeutsche Allgemeine Zeitung people